A salai also known as a baaj is a specially-designed needle for turbans that is used by Sikhs for tucking hair from inside the turban and is also used for smoothing out folds. There are various ranges of salai needles used by Sikhs.

See also 
Dastar

References

Sikh religious clothing